Kingston is a city in and the county seat of Roane County, Tennessee, United States. This city is thirty-six miles southwest of Knoxville. It had a population of 5,934 at the 2010 United States census, and is included in the Harriman Micropolitan Statistical Area. Kingston is adjacent to Watts Bar Lake.

History

Kingston has its roots in Fort Southwest Point, which was built just south of present-day Kingston in 1792. At the time, Southwest Point was on the fringe of the legal settlement area for Euro-Americans. A Cherokee village, headed by Chief Tollunteeskee, was situated just across the river, at what is now Rockwood. In 1805, Colonel Return J. Meigs, who operated out of Southwest Point, was appointed Cherokee Agent, effectively moving the agency from the Tellico Blockhouse to Southwest Point. The city of Kingston was established on October 23, 1799, as part of an effort to partition Knox County (the initial effort to form a separate county failed, but succeeded two years later).  Kingston was named after Major Robert King, an officer at Fort Southwest Point in the 1790s.

On September 21, 1807, Kingston was Tennessee's state capital for one day. The Tennessee General Assembly convened in Kingston that day due to an agreement with the Cherokee, who had been told that if the Cherokee Nation ceded the land that is now Roane County, Kingston would become the capital of Tennessee. After adjourning that day, the Assembly resumed meeting in Knoxville.

At the outset of the Civil War in 1861, Kingston was selected as the site of the third session of the East Tennessee Convention, which attempted to form a new, Union-aligned state in East Tennessee.  Due to the Confederate occupation of the region, however, this third session, which was scheduled for August 1861, never took place.  In October 1861, William B. Carter and several co-conspirators planned the East Tennessee bridge burnings from a command post in Kingston. On November 24, 1863, Confederate Cavalry under Joseph Wheeler numbering about 500–1,000 men tried to take Kingston from the Union in the Battle of Kingston, but they were unsuccessful.

In 1955, the Tennessee Valley Authority completed work on the Kingston Fossil Plant, which at the time was the world's largest coal-burning power plant. The plant's 1,000-foot (305 m) smokestacks are a familiar sight to those driving on the Roane County stretch of Interstate 40.

Geography

The town is situated at the confluence of the Clinch, Emory, and Tennessee rivers. These confluences are now part of Watts Bar Lake, a reservoir created by the impoundment of the Tennessee by Watts Bar Dam several miles to the southwest.

Kingston is located near the junction of U.S. Route 70, which connects Kingston with Knoxville to the east and Nashville to the west, and State Route 58, which connects Kingston with Oak Ridge to the northeast and Chattanooga to the south. Interstate 40 passes through Kingston, running roughly parallel to U.S. 70.

Demographics

2020 census

As of the 2020 United States census, there were 5,953 people, 2,225 households, and 1,335 families residing in the city.

2000 census
As of the census of 2000, there were 5,264 people, 2,263 households, and 1,532 families residing in the city. The population density was 803.7 people per square mile (310.3/km2). There were 2,478 housing units at an average density of 378.4 per square mile (146.1/km2). The racial makeup of the city was 93.75% White, 3.55% African American, 0.23% Native American, 0.49% Asian, 0.06% Pacific Islander, 0.23% from other races, and 1.69% from two or more races. Hispanic or Latino of any race were 0.97% of the population.

There were 2,263 households, out of which 26.0% had children under the age of 18 living with them, 54.3% were married couples living together, 10.8% had a female householder with no husband present, and 32.3% were non-families. 29.6% of all households were made up of individuals, and 14.8% had someone living alone who was 65 years of age or older. The average household size was 2.25 and the average family size was 2.77.

In the city, the population was spread out, with 20.5% under the age of 18, 8.2% from 18 to 24, 26.0% from 25 to 44, 24.8% from 45 to 64, and 20.4% who were 65 years of age or older. The median age was 42 years. For every 100 females there were 88.8 males. For every 100 females age 18 and over, there were 87.0 males.

The median income for a household in the city was $34,071, and the median income for a family was $44,979. Males had a median income of $40,186 versus $22,971 for females. The per capita income for the city was $20,301. About 6.0% of families and 10.0% of the population were below the poverty line, including 16.6% of those under age 18 and 8.9% of those age 65 or over.

Newspapers
Roane County News

Notable people
Robert K. Byrd (1823–1885), Union Army colonel and state senator
George Lewis Gillespie, Jr. (1841–1913), U.S. Army general and Medal of Honor recipient
Jennie Jackson (1852-1910), one of the original Fisk Jubilee Singers
Martin W. Littleton (1872–1934), U.S. congressman and attorney, known for defending Harry Thaw at his murder trial
Sam Rayburn (1882–1961), U.S. congressman and Speaker of the House
Bowden Wyatt (1917–1969), University of Tennessee football coach
Wil Crowe Professional baseball player for the Pittsburgh Pirates

References

External links

Municipal Technical Advisory Service entry for Kingston — information on local government, elections, and link to charter

Cities in Tennessee
Cities in Roane County, Tennessee
Tennessee
County seats in Tennessee
Tennessee populated places on the Tennessee River